Göynük Canyon is a canyon in  Antalya Province, southwestern Turkey.

The canyon is located inside the Beydağları Coastal National Park, 
The -long canyon is an important part of the long distance trail Lycian Way. There are waterfalls and ponds inside the canyon. It offers outdoor recreational activities such as hiking and trekking on a daily base. By April 2009, touristic facilities were opened in the canyon, which provide security equipment,  guidance service and food.

Access
The canyon is accessible by an about 45-minute walk from Göynük or by ride on any off-road vehicle or motorcycle, which can be rented in the village. In addition, buses depart from Göynük to the canyon on an hourly base. The canyon entrance is then reached after hiking a  mountainous trail. In the 2022 season, entry to the park cost from €17 (including pontoon crossing), to €23 (including canyoning). The fenced canyon closes at 19:00 hours local time.

References 

Canyons and gorges of Turkey
Landforms of Antalya Province
Tourist attractions in Antalya Province
Kemer District